(John) Maurice Key (4 June 1905 – 21 December 1984) was the Anglican Bishop of Sherborne then Truro in the third quarter of the 20th century.

He was educated at Rossall School and Pembroke College, Cambridge and ordained in 1928. Beginning his ministry with a curacy at St Mary’s Portsea he was successively Vicar of Aylesbeare, Rector of Newton Abbot and finally (before his elevation to the Episcopate) Rural Dean of the Three Towns.

Key failed to take action or to launch an investigation into Jeremy Dowling (later Dowling was convicted of sex offenses against boys).  A review found, “There is no doubt that there were a number of missed opportunities for the diocese of Truro to undertake its own investigations into the allegations made in 1972 against Jeremy Dowling.”  The review also stated, “No institution or organisation should have relied on a police criminal investigation to make judgments on the conduct of those it employs or engages with. It has its own responsibilities to judge such behaviour. These judgments are not tied to the criminal standard but to the civil standard, ie ‘are events more likely than not to have happened’ or ‘on the balance of probabilities’.”

Notes

1905 births
People educated at Rossall School
Alumni of Pembroke College, Cambridge
1984 deaths
Bishops of Sherborne
Bishops of Truro